General Warren may refer to:

Charles Warren (1840–1927), British Army general
Fitz Henry Warren (1816–1878), Union Army brevet major general
George Warren (East India Company officer)  (c. 1801–1884), British Army general
Gouverneur K. Warren (1830–1882), Union Army major general
Henry Warren (general) (born 1922), U.S. Air Force major general
James Warren (politician) (1726–1808), Massachusetts Militia major general in the American Revolutionary War
Joseph Warren (1741–1775), Massachusetts Militia major general in the American Revolutionary War
Robert H. Warren (1917–2010), U.S. Air Force lieutenant general

See also
Attorney General Warren (disambiguation)